The enzyme 16α-hydroxyprogesterone dehydratase catalyzes the chemical reaction

16α-hydroxyprogesterone = 16,17-didehydroprogesterone + H2O

This enzyme belongs to the family of lyases, specifically the hydro-lyases, which cleave carbon-oxygen bonds.  The systematic name of this enzyme class is 16α-hydroxyprogesterone hydro-lyase (16,17-didehydroprogesterone-forming). Other names in common use include hydroxyprogesterone dehydroxylase, 16α-hydroxyprogesterone dehydroxylase, 16α-dehydroxylase, and 16α-hydroxyprogesterone hydro-lyase.

References

 

EC 4.2.1
Enzymes of unknown structure